Jorge Domecq (born 28 November 1960) is a Spanish diplomat who is the former ambassador of Spain to the Philippines. From February 2015 to January 2020, he was the European Defence Agency Chief Executive, appointed by Federica Mogherini.

Bachelor of Law, entered 1985 in the Diplomatic Corps. He has served in the Spanish Embassy in the NATO Council and Brazil. He was adviser Executive Cabinet Minister of Defence, Chief of Cabinet of the Secretary General of NATO and second in command at the Embassy of Spain in Italy. In 2004 he was appointed second in command at the Embassy of Spain in Morocco and in 2005 he held the post of deputy director general of the Bureau of Gibraltar. Later, he was director general of the UN, Global Affairs and Human Rights at the Ministry of Foreign Affairs, and from July 2010 to January 2011 he was director general of Multilateral Affairs.

Honours
 Spanish Cross of Naval Merit (first class)
 Commander and Officer of the Spanish Orders of the Civil Merit and of the Order of Queen Isabel la Católica
 Grand-Officer of the Order of Al-Wissam (Morocco)
 Grand-Officer of the Order of La Stella (Italy)
 Third Degree Knight Commander of Rizal, Order of the Knights of Rizal
 Grand Cross, Order of Sikatuna, gold distinction. Republic of the Philippines

Notes

1960 births
Living people
Spanish diplomats